The Torneo Estivo del 1986 (1986 Summer Tournament) was an Italian official football competition organized by the Lega Calcio and contested by those Serie A teams that had been eliminated from the Coppa Italia before the semi–finals (i.e. all sixteen teams except Como, Fiorentina, Roma and Sampdoria). Players capped by the national team to take part in the upcoming World Cup did not take part in the tournament.

The final was played between Avellino and Bari at the Stadio Santa Colomba in Benevento, on 19 June. Avellino won the match 3–2 to claim the trophy.

Format 
The 12 participants were divided into three groups of four teams with single-legged matches, with the winners and runners-up of each group qualified to the next round. The six remaining sides were divided again in two group of three teams, still with single-legged matches. The two group winners contested the final.

First group stage

Group 1

Group 2

Group 3

Second group stage

Group 1

Group 2

Final

Top scorers 
7 goals
  Alessandro Bertoni (Avellino)
6 goals
  Angelo Alessio (Avellino)
  Pietro Mariani (Torino)
  Paul Rideout (Bari)
3 goals
  Walter Schachner (Torino)

External links 
Results and tables at RSSSF

Defunct football competitions in Italy
Torneo Estivo